Peschanokopsky District is an administrative and municipal district (raion), one of the forty-three in Rostov Oblast, Russia. It is located in the south of the oblast. Its administrative center is the rural locality (a selo) of Peschanokopskoye. Population: 31,619 (2010 Census);  The population of Peschanokopskoye accounts for 33.5% of the district's total population.

Notable residents 

Nina Pereverzeva (1929–2022), Soviet politician, born in Letnik

References

Notes

Sources

Districts of Rostov Oblast